The 1955 Edmonton Eskimos finished in 1st place in the Western Interprovincial Football Union with a 14–2 record and won the 43rd Grey Cup, repeating as Grey Cup champions.

Pre-season

Schedule

Regular season

Standings

Schedule

Playoffs

Grey Cup

References

Edmonton Elks seasons
Grey Cup championship seasons
N. J. Taylor Trophy championship seasons
Edmonton Eskimos
1955 Canadian football season by team